Mariemont (pronounced  ) is a village in Hamilton County, Ohio, United States.  It includes two overlapping historic districts, Village of Mariemont and Mariemont Historic District.  Named for its founder, Mary Emery, Mariemont exhibits English architecture from Norman to classic Georgian style. Several parks exist in the village, including the Concourse on Miami Bluff Drive, and Dogwood Park that offers carillon concerts on Sundays throughout the summer months. The village square serves as the community center with red brick Tudor buildings, including the Mariemont Inn and Mariemont Barber Shop. Mariemont has one of the few elected town criers remaining in North America. In 2007, the Village of Mariemont was designated a National Historic Landmark. 
The population was 3,518 at the 2020 census.

History
Madisonville site, the remains of a Fort Ancient village abandoned before Europeans settled in the area in 1786, is located nearby. There is also a pioneer cemetery adjacent to the Mariemont Community Church.

Mariemont was founded by Mary Emery and planned by John Nolen and 25 leading American architects. Emery and other dignitaries broke ground on April 23, 1923. Emery had spent around seven million dollars of her own money to purchase the land that would become Mariemont. Her vision was of a planned community reminiscent of an English garden city that would welcome people of differing economic backgrounds, with a mix of single-family homes and affordable low-rise apartments.

However, the dream of welcoming all classes was not achieved in the end. Construction costs drove rents up considerably higher than those in the city that Emery had hoped to help others escape. In 2008, owing to its "unique character, compact and walkable design, and strong citizen participation and engagement", the American Planning Association designated Mariemont a "Great Neighbourhood".

Geography

Education
Mariemont is served by the Mariemont City School District, which includes Mariemont High School.

Demographics

2010 census
According to the 2010 census, there were 3,403 people, 1,443 households, and 877 families living in the village. The racial makeup of the village was 94.7% White, 1.6% African American, 0.2% Native American, 1.3% Asian, 0.1% Pacific Islander, 0.5% from other races, and 1.7% from two or more races. Hispanic or Latino of any race were 1.6% of the population.

As of 2013, 3,380 people live in Mariemont.

There were 1,443 households, of which 35.4% had children under the age of 18 living with them, 49.3% were married couples living together, 8.8% had a female householder with no husband present, 2.6% had a male householder with no wife present, and 39.2% were non-families. 33.7% of all households were made up of individuals, and 14% had someone living alone who was 65 years of age or older. The average household size was 2.34 and the average family size was 3.08.

The median age in the village was 36.6 years. 28.2% of residents were under the age of 18; 5.2% were between the ages of 18 and 24; 29.1% were from 25 to 44; 24.6% were from 45 to 64; and 12.9% were 65 years of age or older. The gender makeup of the village was 45.2% male and 54.8% female.

2000 census
As of the census of 2000, there were 3,408 people, 1,463 households, and 886 families living in the village. The population density was 3,991.7 people per square mile (1,548.0/km2). There were 1,541 housing units at an average density of 1,804.9 per square mile (700.0/km2). The racial makeup of the village was 96.92% White, 1.00% African American, 0.23% Native American, 0.79% Asian, 0.12% Pacific Islander, 0.21% from other races, and 0.73% from two or more races. Hispanic or Latino of any race were 1.03% of the population.

There were 1,463 households, out of which 33.3% had children under the age of 18 living with them, 49.3% were married couples living together, 9.9% had a female householder with no husband present, and 39.4% were non-families. 35.1% of all households were made up of individuals, and 14.8% had someone living alone who was 65 years of age or older. The average household size was 2.26 and the average family size was 2.97.

In the village, the population was spread out, with 26.8% under the age of 18, 4.0% from 18 to 24, 31.2% from 25 to 44, 20.0% from 45 to 64, and 17.9% who were 65 years of age or older. The median age was 38 years. For every 100 females, there were 77.8 males. For every 100 females age 18 and over, there were 70.8 males.

The median income for a household in the village was $57,614, and the median income for a family was $81,358. Males had a median income of $59,400 versus $38,938 for females. The per capita income for the village was $32,897. About 3.6% of families and 5.0% of the population were below the poverty line, including 7.3% of those under age 18 and 2.3% of those age 65 or over.

See also
 Calcot Manor
 Eliphalet Ferris House
 Mariemont High School

References

External links

 Village website
 Mariemont Preservation Foundation
 Cincinnati Photographs including Mariemont
 Village of Mariemont - The Village Connection - Information about Mariemont
 Mariemont Community Guide

Villages in Hamilton County, Ohio
Villages in Ohio
Planned communities in the United States
1923 establishments in Ohio
Tudor Revival architecture in Ohio